The  is the former palace of the Emperor of Japan. Since the Meiji Restoration in 1869, the Emperors have resided at the Tokyo Imperial Palace, while the preservation of the Kyoto Imperial Palace was ordered in 1877. Today, the grounds are open to the public, and the Imperial Household Agency hosts public tours of the buildings several times a day.

The Kyoto Imperial Palace is the latest of the imperial palaces built at or near its site in the northeastern part of the old capital of Heian-kyō (now known as Kyoto) after the abandonment of the larger original Heian Palace that was located to the west of the current palace during the Heian period. The Palace lost much of its function at the time of the Meiji Restoration, when the capital functions were moved to Tokyo in 1869. However, Emperor Taishō and Shōwa still had their enthronement ceremonies at the palace.

Layout 

It also contains the Sentō Imperial Palace gardens and the Kyoto State Guest House. The estate dates from the early Edo period when the residence of high court nobles were grouped close together with the palace and the area walled. When the capital was moved to Tokyo, the residences of the court nobles were demolished and most of Kyōto Gyoen is now a park open to the public.

The Imperial Palace has been officially located in this area since the final abandonment of the Heian Palace in late 12th century. The palace, like many of the oldest and most important buildings in Japan, was destroyed by fire and rebuilt many times over the course of its history. It has been destroyed and rebuilt eight times, six of them during the 250-year-long peace of the Edo period. The version currently standing was completed in 1855, with an attempt at reproducing the Heian period architecture and style of the original dairi of the Heian Palace.

The grounds include a number of buildings, along with the imperial residence. The Imperial Household Agency maintains the building and the grounds and also runs public tours.

Structures 

Okurumayose 
Dignitaries with special permission for official visits used to enter the palace through the  entrance.

Shodaibunoma 
The  building was used as a waiting room for dignitaries on their official visits to the palace. They were ushered into three different anterooms according to their ranks.

Shinmikurumayose 
The  structure was built as a new carriage entrance on the occasion of the enthronement ceremony of Emperor Taisho in 1915.

Gates 

This gate would have been used on the rare occasions of the Emperor welcoming a foreign diplomat or dignitary, as well as for many other important state ceremonies. Passing through the Kenreimon, the inner gate Jomeimon would appear, which is painted in vermilion and roofed in tile. This leads to the Shishin-den, which is the Hall for State Ceremonies. The Gekkamon is a smaller gate on the west side of the main courtyard.

The annual Aoi Matsuri in May is the procession of the Saiō-Dai, historically a priestess of the imperial house, to the Shimogamo Shrine and Kamigamo Shrine. The procession departs in front of the Kenreimon.

Another gate in the outer courtyard is the Kenshunmon, which has a similar architectural style to the Kenreimon. Located next to the Kenshunmon is a square where the traditional ball game Kemari is played.

Shunkōden 

The  was constructed to house the sacred mirror on the occasion of the enthronement ceremony of Emperor Taisho in 1915. The roof is modern in that it is made out of copper and not wooden shingles.

Shishinden 

The  is the most important ceremonial building within the palace grounds. The enthronement ceremonies of Emperor Taisho and Emperor Showa took place here. On either side of its main stairway were planted trees which would become very famous and sacred, a cherry (sakura) on the eastern, left side, and a tachibana orange tree on the right to the west. The garden of white gravel played an important role in the ceremony.

Within this is a wide open space, crossed by boarded-over sections, leading to the central throne room.

Takamikura 

The  is the Imperial throne. It has been used on the occasion of the enthronement ceremonies commencing in 707 in the reign of Empress Genmei. The present throne was modeled on the original design, constructed in 1913, two years before the enthronement of Emperor Taishō. The actual throne is a chair in black lacquer, placed under an octagonal canopy resting on a three-tiered dais painted with black lacquer with balustrades of vermilion. On both sides of the throne are two little tables, where two of the three Imperial regalia (the sword and the jewel), and the privy seal and state seal would be placed. On top of the canopy is a statue of a large phoenix called hō-ō. Surrounding the canopy are eight small phoenixes, jewels and mirrors. Hanging from the canopy are metal ornaments and curtains.

The sliding door that hid the Emperor from view is called , and has an image of 32 celestial saints painted upon it, which became one of the primary models for all of Heian period painting.

Michodai 
The  is the August Seat of the Empress. The current throne was constructed in 1913. Its colour and shape are the same as the Takamikura, but is slightly smaller and more simple in comparison. The canopy is decorated with a statue of the mythical bird ranchō.

The Imperial throne is always placed in the center of the main hall, the michodai to the right of it. Both thrones are kept away from public view through screens called misu.

Seiryōden 

The  sits to the west of the Shishin-den, facing east. It, too, has a hipped and gabled roof, and is primarily cypress wood. Originally a place where the Emperor would conduct his own personal affairs, the Seiryō-den was later used for various gatherings and meetings as well. In the center is an area where the Emperor would rest, and on the east side of the hall, an area of two tatami was set aside for dignitaries and aristocrats to sit. Here was where the Emperor could conduct formal affairs. On the north side of the hall was an enclosed area where the Emperor would sleep at night; later, Emperors began to use the official residence. The west side was set aside for the Emperor's breakfasts, and also contained the lavatories, while the south side was used by the keeper of the Imperial Archives. This area contained paintings by the masters of the Tosa school, and just outside, various rare bamboos were planted.

The original structure was built as the Emperor's residence at the end of the 8th century and was used until the 11th century. The Seiryō-den was rebuilt in this location in 1790 CE, on a smaller scale than the original building but preserving the original structure.

Kogosho 
The  is a place where the Emperor received bannermen under the direct control of the Tokugawa shogun (buke). It was also used for some rituals. 
This distinctive building shows a blend of architectural elements of shinden zukuri and shoin zukuri styles.

The Kogosho Conference was held here on the night of December 9, 1867, the declaration of the restoration of imperial rule (osei fukko). The structure burnt down in 1954 and was reconstructed in 1958.

Ogakumonjo 
The study hall  was for reading rites, a monthly poetry recital and also a place the Emperor received nobles. It is a shoin zukuri style building with an irimoya hiwadabuki roof.

Otsunegoten 
The  was used as the Emperor's residence until the capital was transferred to Tokyo in 1869. It is the largest structure of the palace with fifteen rooms. Facing it is the Gonaeitei garden.

Osuzumisho 

The  is the summer residence for the Emperor.

Koshun 
The  is a study hall that was used by Emperor Komei, who reigned from 1846 to 1866.

Omima 
The  was used for unofficial ceremonies such as the Star Festival and the Bon festival.

The Palace's  is walking distance from JR Nijō Station.

See also
 Kyoto Gyoen National Garden

References

External links

 Official website
 Official English guide of Kyoto Imperial Palace 公益財団法人菊葉文化協会

Houses completed in 1855
Buildings and structures in Kyoto
Gardens in Kyoto Prefecture
Imperial residences in Japan
Tourist attractions in Kyoto
1855 establishments in Japan